Emma Jackson is the name of:

 Emma Jackson (triathlete) (born 1991), triathlete from Australia
 Emma Jackson (runner) (born 1988), 800m runner from England
 Emma Jackson (Home and Away), a fictional character played by Dannii Minogue